Discotek Media is an American entertainment company based in Altamonte Springs, Florida, focused on distribution and licensing Japanese anime, films, and television series.

History
Formed in 2005, Discotek primarily focuses on licensing retro titles from the 1970s, 1980s, and 1990s, a lot of them "license rescued" from other companies such as Funimation, Viz Media, ADV Films, Bandai Entertainment, Geneon, Manga Entertainment, etc. Their licenses include most of the Lupin the Third franchise (including the Hayao Miyazaki film The Castle of Cagliostro), the first season of Digimon, Fist of the North Star, Sonic X, Hajime no Ippo, Urusei Yatsura, Galaxy Express 999, and Bobobo-bo Bo-bobo, as well as OVAs such as Giant Robo and Gunbuster and films such as Memories and Project A-ko. The company has also acquired several recent titles and has collaborated with streaming service Crunchyroll on several releases including KonoSuba, Kemono Friends, and 5 Centimeters per Second.

Discotek Media announced a new sub-label as a return to live-action films known as Nihon Nights, which started in 2022 with the 2000 film Uzumaki'''s Blu-ray release. They also announced another sub-label for Tokusatsu series and films known as Toku Time and it started that same year with Space Sheriff Gavan.

The company is notable for being a major adopter of the SD Blu-ray format, using it to release anime that do not have HD masters available.

 Current titles 
 Television shows 

 07-Ghost (2009; Studio Deen)
 Actually, I am... (2015; TMS Entertainment & 3xCube)
 The Adventures of the Little Prince (1978–79; Knack Productions) (dubbed version only for home video, subbed version only for streaming; license rescued from Koch Vision)
 Adventures of Sonic the Hedgehog (1993–96; DIC Entertainment/Bohbot Entertainment) (Cartoon; Licensed from 41 Entertainment and Invincible Entertainment Partners; Other rights to this title lay with WildBrain)
 Aho-Girl (2017; Diomedéa) (distribution for Crunchyroll)
 Aim for the Ace! (1973–74; TMS Entertainment)
 All Purpose Cultural Cat Girl Nuku Nuku TV (1998; Ashi Productions) (license rescued from ADV Films)
 Angel's 3Piece! (2017; Project No.9) (distribution for Crunchyroll)
 Anti-Magic Academy: The 35th Test Platoon (2015; Silver Link) (distribution for Crunchyroll)
 Arpeggio of Blue Steel -Ars Nova- (2013; Sanzigen) (distribution for Crunchyroll)
 Arcadia of My Youth: Endless Orbit SSX (1982–83; Toei Animation)
 As Miss Beelzebub Likes (2018; Liden Films) (distribution for Crunchyroll)
 Astro Boy 1980 (1980-81; Tezuka Productions) (license rescued from Manga Entertainment)
 Astroganger (1972–73; Knack Productions)
 Ayakashi (2007–08; Tokyo Kid)
 Ayakashi: Samurai Horror Tales (2006; Toei Animation) (license rescued from Geneon)
 Bananya (2016; Gathering with cooperation of TMS Entertainment) (original dub commissioned by Discotek Media)
 Bananya and the Curious Bunch (2019; Gathering with cooperation of TMS Entertainment) (original dub commissioned by Discotek Media)
 Battery (2016; Zero-G) (exclusively streaming on Amazon Prime Video due to Noitamina deal)
 Battle Athletes Victory (1997–98; AIC) (license rescued from Geneon)
 Beast Fighter: The Apocalypse (2003; Magic Bus)
 Beelzebub (2011–12; Pierrot Plus)
 Beyblade (2001; Madhouse) (dubbed version only; license rescued from Nelvana with distribution by Geneon, then named Pioneer, and then Cinedigm)
 Beyblade: G-Revolution (2003; Nippon Animation) (dubbed version only; license rescued from Nelvana with distribution by Funimation)
 Beyblade: V-Force (2002; Nippon Animation) (dubbed version only; license rescued from Nelvana)
 Big Order (2016; Lerche) (distribution for Crunchyroll)
 Black Rock Shooter (2012; Ordet & Sanzigen) (original dub commissioned by Discotek Media; was streamed on Funimation)
 Bludgeoning Angel Dokuro-chan (2005; Hal Film Maker) (license rescued from Media Blasters under Anime Works)
 Bludgeoning Angel Dokuro-chan 2 (2007; Hal Film Maker) (license rescued from Media Blasters under Anime Works)
 Blue Seed (1994–95; Production I.G & Production Reed) (license rescued from ADV Films; HIDIVE streaming via Maiden Japan)
 Bobobo-bo Bo-bobo (2003–05; Toei Animation) (license rescued from Illumitoon Entertainment with distribution from Westlake Entertainment, and then S'more Entertainment)
 Bokurano (2007; Gonzo)
 Boys Over Flowers (1996–97; Toei Animation) (license rescued from Viz Media)
 Brave 10 (2012; Studio Sakimakura with cooperation of TMS Entertainment) (license rescued from NIS America)
 Caligula (2018; Satelight) (distribution for Crunchyroll)
 Cat's Eye (1983–84; TMS Entertainment) (license rescued from Nozomi Entertainment)
 Ceres, Celestial Legend (2000; Studio Pierrot) (license rescued from Viz Media)
 Chargeman Ken! (1974; Knack Productions)
 Chi's Sweet Home (2008; Madhouse)
 Chi's Sweet Home: Chi's New Address (2009; Madhouse)
 Cinderella Boy (2003; Magic Bus) (former Enoki Films USA license)
 City Hunter (1987–88; Sunrise) (license rescued from ADV Films)
 City Hunter 2  (1988–89; Sunrise) (license rescued from ADV Films)
 City Hunter 3 (1989–90; Sunrise) (license rescued from ADV Films)
 City Hunter '91 (1991; Sunrise) (license rescued from ADV Films)
 Combattler V (1976–77; Toei Company & Sunrise)
 Comic Party (2001; OLM, Inc.) (license rescued from Nozomi Entertainment with distribution from ADV Films)
 Cromartie High School (2003–04; Production I.G) (license rescued from ADV Films)
 Cutie Honey (1973–74; Toei Animation)
 Cutie Honey: The Live (2007–08; TV Tokyo) (Tokusatsu)
 Cybersix (1999; Network of Animation & TMS Entertainment) (license rescued from Saban Entertainment)
 Cyborg 009: The Cyborg Soldier (2001–02; Japan Vistic) (license rescued from Avex, Inc. with distribution from Sony Pictures Home Entertainment, then named Columbia TriStar Home Entertainment)
 Dai-Guard (1999–2000; Xebec) (license rescued from ADV Films)
 Dancouga – Super Beast Machine God (1985; Ashi Productions)
 Dear Brother (1991–92; Tezuka Productions) (license rescued from Anime Sols)
 DearS (2004; Daume) (license rescued from Geneon)
 Demon Lord Dante (2002; Magic Bus) (license rescued from Media Blasters under Anime Works, then Geneon, both with distribution by Enoki Films USA)
 Descendants of Darkness (2000; J.C.Staff) (license rescued from Central Park Media under U.S. Manga Corps)
 Devilman (1972–73; Toei Animation)
 Devilman Lady (1998–99; TMS Entertainment) (license rescued from ADV Films)
 Digimon (1999–2000; Toei Animation) (season one only; license rescued from Saban Entertainment with distribution by 20th Century Studios, Buena Vista Home Video & Cinedigm)
 Dino Mech Gaiking (1976–77; Toei Animation)
 Dinosaur King (2007–08; Sunrise) (dubbed version only; license rescued from 4Kids Entertainment with distribution from Shout! Factory)
 DNA² (1994; Madhouse & Studio Deen) (license rescued from Central Park Media under U.S. Manga Corps)
 Double Dragon (1993–94; DiC Entertainment) (license rescued from Buena Vista Home Video)
 Dororo (1969; Mushi Production) (license rescued from Anime Sols)
 Eat-Man (1997; Studio Deen) (license rescued from Bandai Entertainment)
 Eat-Man '98 (1998; Studio Deen) (license rescued from Bandai Entertainment)
 Elemental Gelade (2005; Xebec) (license rescued from Geneon with itself having later distribution by Funimation)
 Eternal Alice (2006; Trinet Entertainment & Picture Magic)
 Fighting Foodons (2001–02; Group TAC) (dubbed version only; license rescued from 4Kids Entertainment with distribution by Enoki Films USA)
 Fighting General Daimos (1978–79; Toei Company & Sunrise)
 Fist of the North Star (1984–87; Toei Animation) (first 36 episodes license rescued from Manga Entertainment)
 Fist of the North Star 2 (1987–88; Toei Animation)
 Flame of Recca (1997–98; Studio Pierrot) (license rescued from Viz Media)
 Fushigi Yûgi (1995–96; Studio Pierrot) (streaming on Crunchyroll only; Media Blasters under Anime Works has current home video rights, which they have license rescued from Geneon)
 Future Robo Daltanious (1979–80; Toei Animation & Sunrise)
 Gakuen Heaven (2006; Tokyo Kids) (streaming on Crunchyroll only; Media Blasters under Anime Works has current home video rights)
 Gakuen Utopia Manabi Straight! (2007; Ufotable)
 Galaxy Express 999 (1978–81; Toei Animation) (license rescued from S'more Entertainment)
 Ghost Stories (2000–01; Studio Pierrot) (license rescued from ADV Films)
 Giant Gorg (1984; Sunrise) (license rescued from Bandai Entertainment)
 Girly Air Force (2019; Satelight) (distribution for Crunchyroll)
 God Mazinger (1984; TMS Entertainment)
 God Mars (1981–82; TMS Entertainment)
 Gokudo (1999; Trans Arts) (license rescued from Media Blasters under Anime Works with distribution by Enoki Films USA)
 GoShogun (1981–82; Ashi Productions) (license rescued from Saban Entertainment)
 Great Mazinger (1974–75; Toei Animation)
 The Great Passage (2016; Zexcs) (exclusively streaming on Amazon Prime Video due to Noitamina deal)
 Great Teacher Onizuka (1999–2000; Studio Pierrot) (license rescued from Tokyopop with later distribution by Funimation)
 Grimm's Fairy Tale Classics (1987–88; Nippon Animation) (license rescued from Saban Brands)
 Gun Frontier (2002; Vega Entertainment) (license rescued from Media Blasters with distribution from Enoki Films USA)
 Hajime no Ippo (2000–02; Madhouse) (Season 1 only; license rescued from Geneon)
 Hanasakeru Seishōnen (2009–10; Studio Pierrot)
 Hi-sCoool! Seha Girls (2014; TMS Entertainment & Genies)
 Holmes of Kyoto (2018; Seven) (distribution for Crunchyroll)
 Honey and Clover (2005; J.C.Staff) (license rescued from Viz Media)
 Honey and Clover II (2006; J.C.Staff) (license rescued from Viz Media)
 IGPX Microseries (2003; Bee Train & Production I.G) (distribution for Toonami; license rescued from Bandai Entertainment)
 IGPX TV Series (2005–06; Production I.G) (distribution for Toonami; license rescued from Bandai Entertainment)
 Inukami! (2006; Seven Arcs)
 Isuca (2015; Arms) (distribution for Crunchyroll)
 Itazura na Kiss (2008; TMS Entertainment)
 Izumo: Flash of a Brave Sword (2005; Trinet Entertainment & Studio Kuma) (former Enoki Films USA license)
 Kaiba (2008; Madhouse)
 Kamen no Maid Guy (2008; Madhouse)
 Kamen Rider Black (1987–88; Toei Company) (Tokusatsu)
 Kamen Rider Black RX (1988–89; Toei Company) (Tokusatsu; license rescued from Saban Brands)
 Karate Master (1973–74; TMS Entertainment)
 Kashimashi: Girl Meets Girl (2006; Studio Hibari) (license rescued from Media Blasters under AnimeWorks)
 Kekkaishi (2006–08; Sunrise) (license rescued from Viz Media)
 Kemono Friends (2017; Yaoyorozu) (distribution for Crunchyroll; first season only; original dub commissioned by Discotek Media)
 Kenichi: The Mightiest Disciple (2006–07; TMS Entertainment) (license rescued from Funimation)
 Kimagure Orange Road (1987–88; Studio Pierrot) (license rescued from AnimEigo)
 The King of Braves GaoGaiGar (1997–98; Sunrise) (license rescued from Media Blasters)
 Kodocha (1996–98; Gallop) (license rescued from Funimation)
 Koi Koi Seven (2005; Studio Flag & Trinet Entertainment) (former Enoki Films USA license)
 KonoSuba (2016–17; Studio Deen) (distribution for Crunchyroll)
 Kyatto Ninden Teyandee (Samurai Pizza Cats) (1990–91; Tatsunoko Production) (license rescued from Saban Entertainment)
 Kyo Kara Maoh! (2004–09; Studio Deen) (Seasons 1 and 2 license rescued from Geneon with later distribution by Funimation)
 Kyōsōgiga (2013; Toei Animation)
 Lady Oscar: The Rose of Versailles (1979–80; TMS Entertainment) (license rescued from Nozomi Entertainment)
 The Law of Ueki (2005–06; Studio Deen) (license rescued from Geneon with later distribution from Funimation)
 The Legend of Black Heaven (1999; AIC & A.P.P.P.) (license rescued by Geneon)
 The Legend of Calamity Jane (1997–98; Gangster Production, Contre Allée & Warner Bros. Animation) (Cartoon)
 Library War (2008; Production I.G)
 Lovely Complex (2007; Toei Animation)
 Lupin III Part I (1971–72; Tokyo Movie) (original dub commissioned by TMS Entertainment)
 Lupin III Part II (1977–80; Tokyo Movie Shinsha) (license rescued from Geneon; Episodes 145 and 155 license rescued from Streamline Pictures)
 Lupin III Part III (1984–85; Tokyo Movie Shinsha)
 Lupin III Part IV: The Italian Adventure (2015–16; Telecom Animation Film) (original dub commissioned by TMS Entertainment; Funimation has streaming rights to the dub)
 Lupin the 3rd Part V: Misadventures in France (2018; Telecom Animation Film) (original dub commissioned by TMS Entertainment)
 Lupin III: The Woman Called Fujiko Mine (2012; TMS Entertainment) (license rescued from Funimation)
 Machine Robo: Battle Hackers (1987; Ashi Productions)
 Machine Robo: Revenge of Cronos (1986–87; Ashi Productions) (license rescued from Central Park Media)
 Magic Knight Rayearth (1994–95; Tokyo Movie Shinsha) (license rescued from Media Blasters under Anime Works)
 Magical Canan (2005; AIC)
 Magical Girl Ore (2018; Pierrot Plus) (distribution for Crunchyroll)
 Mahoraba ~Heartful days~ (2005; J.C.Staff)
 Marmalade Boy (1994–95; Toei Animation) (license rescued from Tokyopop)
 Mazinger Edition Z: The Impact! (2009; Bee Media & Code)
 Mazinger Z (1972–74; Toei Animation)
 Medabots (1999–2001; Bee Train (Seasons 1 & 2) & Trans Arts with cooperation of Production I.G (Season 3)) (license rescued from Nelvana with distribution from ADV Films and Shout! Factory)
 Mega Man (1994–96; Ruby-Spears & Ashi Productions) (Cartoon; license rescued from Sony Wonder and ADV Films; WildBrain currently has the license to its library)
 Megabeast Investigator Juspion (1985–86; Toei Company) (Tokusatsu)
 Message from Space: Galactic Wars (1978–79; Toei Company) (Tokusatsu)
 Miss Machiko (1981–83; Studio Pierrot)
 Mitchiri Neko (2018; helo.inc) (distribution for Crunchyroll)
 Miyanishi Tatsuya Gekijō: You Are Umasou (2010; Kids & TMS Etnertainment)
 Mononoke (2007; Toei Animation) (license rescued from Cinedigm)
 Ms. Koizumi Loves Ramen Noodles (2018; Studio Gokumi & AXsiZ) (distribution for Crunchyroll)
 Mrs. Pepperpot (1983–84; Studio Pierrot) (license rescued from unknown licensor)
 Ms. Vampire Who Lives in My Neighborhood (2018; Studio Gokumi & AXsiZ) (distribution for Crunchyroll)
 Mon Colle Knights (2000; Studio Deen) (license rescued from Saban Entertainment)
 Monkey Magic (1999–2000; Group TAC) (license rescued from Bandai Entertainment with distribution from Geneon, then named Pioneer)
 Monster Farm (Monster Rancher) (1999–2001; TMS Entertainment) (license rescued from BKN and ADV Films)
 Nagasarete Airantō (2007; Feel)
 New Grimm's Fairy Tale Classics (1988–89; Nippon Animation) (license rescued from Saban Brands)
 NG Knight Lamune & 40 (1990–91; Ashi Productions)
 NieA_7 (2000; Triangle Staff) (license rescued from Geneon)
 Ninja Senshi Tobikage (Ninja Robots) (1985–86; Studio Pierrot) (license rescued from Alexander Entertainment Group, CBS Television & Anime Sols)
 Nightwalker: The Midnight Detective (1998; AIC) (license rescued from Central Park Media under U.S. Manga Corps)
 Ninja Scroll: The Series (2003; Madhouse) (license rescued from Urban Vision)
 Nogizaka Haruka no Himitsu (2008; Diomedéa)
 Nogizaka Haruka no Himitsu: Purezza (2009; Diomedéa)
 Nyanbo! (2016–17; Shirogumi) (distribution for Crunchyroll)
 Osomatsu-kun (1988) (1988–89; Studio Pierrot) (streaming on Crunchyroll only)
 Pilot Candidate (2000; Xebec) (license rescued from Bandai Entertainment)
 Planet With (2018; J.C.Staff) (distribution for Crunchyroll)
 Poco's Udon World (2016; Liden Films) (distribution for Crunchyroll)
 Powered Armor Dorvack (1983–84; Ashi Productions)
 Project ARMS (2001–02; TMS Entertainment) (license rescued from Viz Media)
 Psybuster (1999; Production Reed) (license rescued from Geneon)
 Psycho Armor Govarian (1983; Knack Production)
 Reborn! (2006–10; Artland) (license rescued from Viz Media; still streaming on Viz Media at Hulu)
 Requiem from the Darkness (2003; TMS Entertainment) (license rescued from Geneon)
 Saber Rider and the Star Sheriffs (1987–88; World Events Productions & Studio Pierrot) (license rescued from VCI Entertainment)
 Saint Tail (1995–96; TMS Entertainment) (license rescued from Tokyopop)
 Saiyuki ReLoad (2003–04; Studio Pierrot) (license rescued from Geneon)
 Saiyuki ReLoad GunLock (2004; Studio Pierrot) (license rescued from Geneon)
 Samurai Troopers (Ronin Warriors) (1988–89; Sunrise) (license rescued from Bandai Entertainment)
 School Days (2007; TNK)
 s-CRY-ed (2001; Sunrise) (license rescued from Bandai Entertainment and Sentai Filmworks)
 Sgt. Frog (2004–11; Sunrise) (license rescued from ADV Films and Funimation; still streaming on Funimation)
 Shaman King (2001–02; Xebec) (license rescued from 4Kids Entertainment with distribution by Funimation)
 She and Her Cat: Everything Flows (2016; Liden Films Kyoto Studio) (distribution for Crunchyroll; original dub commissioned by Discotek Media)
 Sherlock Hound (1984–85; TMS Entertainment, RAI & Gallop) (license rescued from Geneon)
 Shin Tetsujin 28 (1980–81; Tokyo Movie Shinsha)
 Shining Tears X Wind (2007; Studio Deen)
 Sister Princess (2001; Zexcs) (license rescued from ADV Films)
 Sister Princess: RePure (2002; Zexcs)
 Skull-face Bookseller Honda-san (2018; DLE) (distribution for Crunchyroll)
 Sonic X (2003–06; TMS Entertainment) (license rescued from 4Kids Entertainment with distribution by Funimation)
 Sorcerer Hunters (1995–96; Xebec) (license rescued from ADV Films)
 Soul Hunter (1999; Studio Deen) (license rescued from ADV Films with distribution by Enoki Films USA)
 Soul Link (2006; Picture Magic)
 Space Adventure Cobra (1982–83; TMS Entertainment) (license rescued from Nozomi Entertainment)
 Space Pirate Captain Harlock (1978–79; Toei Animation)
 Space Sheriff Gavan (1982–83; Toei Company) (Tokusatsu)
 Space Warrior Baldios (1980–81; Ashi Productions & Kokusai Eiga-sha)
 Star Ocean EX (2001; Studio Deen) (license rescued from Geneon)
 Stellvia (2003; Xebec) (license rescued from Geneon)
 Street Fighter (1995–97; Graz Entertainment (Season 1) & InVision Entertainment (Season 2)) (Cartoon; license rescued from ADV Films)
 Street Sharks (1993–97; DIC Entertainment/Bohbot Entertainment) (Cartoon; Licensed from 41 Entertainment and Invincible Entertainment Partners)
 Submarine Super 99 (2003; Vega Entertainment) (former Enoki Films USA license)
 Super Dimension Century Orguss (1983–84; TMS Entertainment with production of Studio Nue & Artland) (license rescued from U.S. Renditions and ImaginAsian Entertainment)
 Symphogear (2012–19; Satelight) (Season 1 was streamed on Funimation)
 Tenjho Tenge (2004; Madhouse) (license rescued from Geneon)
 Tetsujin 28-go GX (1992–93; TMS Entertainment)
 Tetsujin 28 (2004) (2004; Palm Studio) (license rescued from Geneon)
 Thermae Romae (2012; DLE) (original dub commissioned by Discotek Media)
 To Be Hero (2016; Studio LAN) (distribution for Crunchyroll)
 To Be Heroine (2018; Studio LAN) (distribution for Crunchyroll)
 Tokyo Underground (2002; Studio Pierrot) (license rescued from Geneon)
 Treasure Island (1978–79; TMS Entertainment)
 True Tears (2008; P.A. Works) (license rescued from Bandai Visual USA with distribution by Bandai Entertainment)
 The Twelve Kingdoms (2002–03; Studio Pierrot) (license rescued from Media Blasters under Anime Works)
 Ultimate Muscle: The Kinnikuman Legacy (2002–06; Toei Animation) (dubbed version only; licensed rescued from 4Kids Entertainment with distribution by Funimation)
 Ultra Maniac (2003; Ashi Productions) (license rescued from Geneon and Viz Media)
 Urusei Yatsura (1981–86; Studio Pierrot (1–106) & Studio Deen (107–195)) (license rescued from AnimEigo)
 Video Warrior Laserion (1984–85; Toei Animation)
 Virtua Fighter (1995–96; TMS Entertainment) (license rescued from Media Blasters under Anime Works)
 Voltes V (1977–78; Toei Company & Sunrise) (license rescued from 3B Productions)
 VS Knight Ramune & 40 Fire (1996; Ashi Productions)
 Wild 7: Another (2002; E&G Films) (license rescued from Media Blasters under Anime Works with distribution by Enoki Films USA)
 The Wonderful Adventures of Nils Holgersson (1980–81; Studio Pierrot)
 The Wonderful Wizard of Oz (1986–87; Panmedia) (license rescued from Cookie Jar Group)
 X-Bomber (Star Fleet) (1980–81; Fuji TV) (Puppet show; license rescued from Leah Productions)
 Yowamushi Pedal (2013–18; TMS Entertainment) (Season 1, Grande Road and New Generation only; New Generation is distributed for Crunchyroll)
 Z/X Ignition (2014; Telecom Animation Film) (original dub commissioned by TMS Entertainment)
 Zombie-Loan (2007; Xebec)

 Films 

 Adieu Galaxy Express 999 (1981; Toei Animation) (license rescued from Viz Media)
 Aim for the Ace! The Movie (1979; Tokyo Movie Shinsha)
 Amazing Nuts! (2006; Studio 4°C)
 Anata o Zutto Aishiteru (2015; Media Castle & TMS Entertainment)
 Another (2012; Toho) (live-action)
 Aquarian Age: Juvenile Orion (2008; Broccoli) (Live action)
 Arcadia of My Youth (1982; Toei Animation) (license rescued from AnimEigo)
 Arion (1986; Sunrise)
 Baldios: The Movie (1981; Ashi Productions & Kokusai Eiga-sha)
 Barefoot Gen (1983; Madhouse) (license rescued from Geneon)
 Barefoot Gen 2 (1986; Madhouse) (license rescued from Geneon)
 Bohachi Bushido: Code of the Forgotten Eight (1973; Toei Company) (Live action)
 Bohachi Bushido: The Villain (1974; Toei Company) (Live action)
 Black Jack: the Movie (1996; Tezuka Productions) (license rescued from Manga Entertainment)
 The Bullet Train (1975; Toei Company) (Live action)
 Burning Paradise (1994; DLO Films Production Limited) (Live action)
 The Calamari Wrestler (2004; Imagica Corp.) (Live action)
 Cardcaptor Sakura: The Movie (1999; Madhouse) (license rescued from Nelvana with distribution from Geneon)
 Cardcaptor Sakura Movie 2: The Sealed Card (2000; Madhouse) (license rescued from Geneon)
 Case Closed: The Crimson Love Letter (2017; TMS Entertainment) (original dub commissioned by TMS Entertainment)
 Case Closed: The Darkest Nightmare (2016; TMS Entertainment) (original dub commissioned by TMS Entertainment)
 Case Closed Episode One: The Great Detective Turned Small (2016; TMS Entertainment) (original dub commissioned by TMS Entertainment)
 Case Closed: The Fist of Blue Sapphire (2019; TMS Entertainment) (original dub commissioned by TMS Entertainment)
 Case Closed: Sunflowers of Inferno (2015; TMS Entertainment) (original dub commissioned by TMS Entertainment)
 Case Closed: Zero the Enforcer (2018; TMS Entertainment) (original dub commissioned by TMS Entertainment)
 City Hunter: .357 Magnum (1989; Sunrise) (license rescued from ADV Films)
 City Hunter: Bay City Wars (1990; Sunrise) (license rescued from ADV Films)
 City Hunter: Death of the Vicious Criminal Ryo Saeba (1999; Sunrise) (television film)
 City Hunter: Goodbye My Sweetheart (1997; Sunrise) (television film; license rescued from ADV Films, who released the film as City Hunter: The Motion Picture)
 City Hunter: Million Dollar Conspiracy (1990; Sunrise) (license rescued from ADV Films)
 City Hunter: The Secret Service (1996; Sunrise) (television film; license rescued from ADV Films)
 City Hunter: Shinjuku Private Eyes (2019; Sunrise) (original dub commissioned by Discotek Media)
 Cleopatra (1970; Mushi Productions)
 Crusher Joe (Studio Nue & Sunrise) (1983; license rescued from AnimEigo)
 Dead or Alive 2 (2000; Daiei Film & Toei Video) (Live action)
 Dr. Slump: "Hoyoyo!" Space Adventure (1982; Toei Animation)
 Dr. Slump and Arale-chan: Hello! Wonder Island (1981; Toei Animation)
 Dr. Slump and Arale-chan: Hoyoyo! Dream Capital Mecha Police (1985; Toei Animation)
 Dr. Slump and Arale-chan: Hoyoyo, Great Across-the-World Race (1983; Toei Animation)
 Dr. Slump and Arale-chan: Hoyoyo! The Treasure of Nanaba Castle (1984; Toei Animation)
 Fair, then Partly Piggy (1988; Oh! Production)
 The Fantastic Adventures of Unico (1981; Sanrio & Madhouse) (license rescued from New Galaxy Anime)
 Fatal Fury: Legend of the Hungry Wolf (1992; Studio Jack) (television film; license rescued from Viz Media with itself having distribution from Geneon, then named Pioneer)
 Fatal Fury: The Motion Picture (1994; Studio Wombat) (license rescued from Viz Media with itself having distribution from Geneon, then named Pioneer)
 Fatal Fury 2: The New Battle (1993; Studio Wombat) (television film; license rescued from Viz Media with itself having distribution from Geneon, then named Pioneer)
 Female Convict Scorpion: Jailhouse 41 (1972; Toei Company) (Live action)
 Female Yakuza Tale: Inquisition and Torture (1973; Toei Company) (Live action; license rescued from Panik House Entertainment)
 Fist of the North Star: The Movie (1986; Toei Animation) (license rescued from Streamline Pictures with itself having later distribution from Image Entertainment)
 Fist of the North Star: The Legends of the True Savior: Legend of Raoh: Chapter of Death in Love (2006; TMS Entertainment) (original dub commissioned by Discotek Media)
 Fist of the North Star: The Legends of the True Savior: Legend of Raoh: Chapter of Fierce Fight (2007; TMS Entertainment)
 Fist of the North Star: The Legends of the True Savior: Zero: Legend of Kenshiro (2008; TMS Entertainment)
 The Flying Phantom Ship (1969; Toei Animation) (original dub commissioned by Discotek Media)
 Fusé: Memoirs of the Hunter Girl (2012; TMS Entertainment) (license rescued from NIS America)
 Galaxy Express 999  (1979; Toei Animation) (license rescued from New World Pictures and Viz Media)
 Galaxy Express 999: Eternal Fantasy (1998; Toei Animation) (original dub commissioned by Discotek Media)
 God Mars: The Movie (1982; Tokyo Movie Shinsha) (license rescued from Nozomi Entertainment)
 Golgo 13 (1973; Toei Company) (live-action)
 Golgo 13: The Professional (1983; Tokyo Movie Shinsha) (license rescued from Urban Vision)
 GoShogun: The Time Étranger (1985; Ashi Productions)
 Great Conquest: The Romance of the Three Kingdoms (1988; Toei Animation) (license rescued from Streamline Pictures)
 Hajime no Ippo: Champion Road (2003; Madhouse) (license rescued from Genon)
 Hans Christian Andersen's The Little Mermaid (1975; Toei Doga) (license rescued from Starmaker and UAV Corporation)
 Hana Yori Dango Final: The Movie (2008; Toho) (Live action)
 Hells (2008; Madhouse) (original dub by Team Four Star with dub production by Sound Cadance Studios)
 Hols: Prince of the Sun (1968; Toei Doga)
 Inukami! The Movie (2007; Seven Arcs)
 Jin-Roh: The Wolf Brigade (2000; Production I.G) (license rescued from Bandai Entertainment and Viz Media)
 A Journey Through Fairyland (1985; Sanrio) (license rescued from Celebrity Home Entertainment under Celebrity's Just for Kids)
 Jungle Emperor Leo (1997; Tezuka Productions) (license rescued from Media Blasters under Anime Works)
 Kimagure Orange Road: I Want to Return to That Day (1988; Studio Pierrot) (license rescued from AnimEigo)
 Legend of Dinosaurs & Monster Birds (1977; Toei Company) (Tokusatsu; license rescued from Frontier Enterprises)
 Like the Clouds, Like the Wind (1990; Studio Pierrot)
 Lily C.A.T. (1987; Studio Pierrot) (license rescued from Streamline Pictures)
 Little Nemo: Adventures in Slumberland (1989; Tokyo Movie Shinsha) (license rescued from Hemdale Film Corporation and Funimation under the Our Time Family Entertainment label)
 Lupin III: Alcatraz Connection (2001; TMS Entertainment) (television film)
 Lupin III: Angel Tactics (2005; TMS Entertainment) (television film)
 Lupin III: Blood Seal of the Eternal Mermaid (2011; TMS Entertainment) (television film; original dub commissioned by TMS Entertainment)
 Lupin III: Bye Bye, Lady Liberty (1989; TMS Entertainment) (television film)
 Lupin III: The Castle of Cagliostro (1979; Tokyo Movie Shinsha) (license rescued from Streamline Pictures and Manga Entertainment)
 Lupin III: The Columbus Files (1999; TMS Entertainment) (television film; license rescued from Funimation)
 Lupin III: Dead or Alive (1996; TMS Entertainment) (license rescued from Funimation)
 Lupin III: Dragon of Doom (1994; TMS Entertainment) (television film; license rescued from Funimation)
 Lupin III: Elusiveness of the Fog (2007; TMS Entertainment) (television film)
 Lupin III: Farewell to Nostradamus (1995; TMS Entertainment) (license rescued from Funimation)
 Lupin III: Episode 0: The First Contact (2002; TMS Entertainment) (television film; original dub commissioned by TMS Entertainment)
 Lupin III: From Siberia with Love (1992; TMS Entertainment) (television film)
 Lupin III: Fujiko's Lie (2019; Telecom Animation Film) (original dub commissioned by TMS Entertainment)
 Lupin III: Goemon's Blood Spray (2017; Telecom Animation Film) (original dub commissioned by TMS Entertainment)
 Lupin III: Goodbye Partner (2019; TMS Entertainment) (television film; original dub commissioned by TMS Entertainment)
 Lupin III: The Hemingway Papers (1990; TMS Entertainment) (television film)
 Lupin III: Island of Assassins (1997; TMS Entertainment) (television film; license rescued from Funimation)
 Lupin III: Jigen's Gravestone (2014; Telecom Animation Film) (Their first original dub; commissioned by TMS Entertainment) 
 Lupin III: The Last Job (2010; TMS Entertainment) (television film)
 Lupin III: Legend of the Gold of Babylon (1985; Tokyo Movie Shinsha) (license rescued from AnimEigo; original dub commissioned by TMS Entertainment)
 Lupin III: Missed by a Dollar (2000; TMS Entertainment) (television film; license rescued from Funimation)
 Lupin III: The Mystery of Mamo (1978; Tokyo Movie Shinsha) (license rescued from Frontier Enterprises, Streamline Pictures and Geneon)
 Lupin III: Napoleon's Dictionary (1991; TMS Entertainment) (television film)
 Lupin III: Operation Return the Treasure (2003; TMS Entertainment) (television film)
 Lupin III: Prison of the Past (2019; TMS Entertainment) (television film; original dub commissioned by TMS Entertainment)
 Lupin III: The Pursuit of Harimao's Treasure (1995; TMS Entertainment) (television film; license rescued from Funimation)
 Lupin III: The Secret of Twilight Gemini (1996; TMS Entertainment) (television film; license rescued from Funimation)
 Lupin III: Swallowtail Tattoo (2004; TMS Entertainment) (television film)
 Lupin III: Tokyo Crisis (1998; TMS Entertainment) (license rescued from Funimation)
 Lupin III: Voyage to Danger (1993; TMS Entertainment) (television film; license rescued from Funimation)
 Lupin III vs. Detective Conan: The Special (2009; TMS Entertainment) (television film) (original dub commissioned by TMS Entertainment)
 Lupin the 3rd vs. Detective Conan: The Movie (2013; TMS Entertainment) (original dub commissioned by TMS Entertainment)
 Magical Girl Lyrical Nanoha: Reflection (2017; Seven Arcs)
 Marmalade Boy (1995; Toei Animation) (license rescued from Tokyopop)
 Memories (1995; Studio 4 °C & Madhouse) (original dub commissioned by Discotek Media; license rescued from Destination Films)
 Night on the Galactic Railroad (1985; Group TAC) (license rescued from Central Park Media)
 Nutcracker Fantasy (1979; Sanrio)
 Oresama (2004; Gaga) (Live action)
 The Princess and the Pilot (2011; Madhouse with production from TMS Entertainment) (license rescued from NIS America)
 Project A-ko (1986; A.P.P.P.) (license rescued from Central Park Media under U.S. Manga Corps)
 Project A-ko 2: Plot of the Daitokuji Financial Group (1987; A.P.P.P.) (license rescued from Central Park Media under U.S. Manga Corps)
 Project A-ko 3: Cinderella Rhapsody (1988; A.P.P.P.) (license rescued from Central Park Media under U.S. Manga Corps)
 Project A-ko 4: FINAL (1989; A.P.P.P.) (license rescued from Central Park Media under U.S. Manga Corps)
 Ringing Bell (1978; Sanrio & Sunrise)
 Robot Carnival (1987; A.P.P.P.) (license rescued from Streamline Pictures and Super Techno Arts)
 Saint Seiya: Evil Goddess Eris (1987; Toei Animation)
 Saint Seiya: The Heated Battle of the Gods (1988; Toei Animation)
 Saint Seiya: Legend of Crimson Youth (1988; Toei Animation)
 Saint Seiya: Warriors of the Final Holy Battle (1989; Toei Animation)
 The Sea Prince and the Fire Child (1982; Sanrio)
 Sex and Zen (1991; Golden Harvest) (Live action)
 Shogun's Samurai (1978; Toei Company) (Live action; license rescued from Adness Entertainment)
 Space Adventure Cobra: The Movie (1982; Tokyo Movie Shinsha) (license rescued from Urban Vision; noted as first 4K Ultra HD anime release in the United States and Canada)
 Storm Riders (1998; Golden Harvest) (Live action; license rescued from Tai Seng)
 Street Fighter II: The Animated Movie (1994; Group TAC) (license rescued from SMV Enterprises and Manga Entertainment)
 Suicide Club (2001; Omega Project) (live-action)
 Swan Lake (1981; Toei Animation) (license rescued from The Samuel Goldwyn Company)
 Taxi Hunter (1993; Media Asia) (Live action)
 Tetsujin 28: Morning Moon of Midday (2007; Palm Studio)
 A Thousand and One Nights (1969; Mushi Productions)
 Tomorrow's Joe (1980; Tokyo Movie Shinsha)
 Tomorrow's Joe 2 (1981; Tokyo Movie Shinsha)
 Toriko the Movie: Secret Recipe of Gourmet God! (2013; Toei Animation)
 Twilight of the Cockroaches (1987; Madhouse) (mix of Anime and Live action; license rescued from Streamline Pictures)
 Unico in the Island of Magic (1983; Sanrio & Madhouse) (license rescued from New Galaxy Anime)
 Urusei Yatsura: Only You (1983; Studio Pierrot) (license rescued from AnimEigo)
 Urusei Yatsura 2: Beautiful Dreamer (1984; Studio Pierrot) (license rescued from Central Park Media)
 Urusei Yatsura 3: Remember My Love (1985; Studio Deen) (license rescued from AnimEigo)
 Urusei Yatsura 4: Lum the Forever (1986; Studio Deen) (license rescued from AnimEigo)
 Urusei Yatsura 5: The Final Chapter (1988; Magic Bus) (license rescued from AnimEigo)
 Urusei Yatsura 6: Always My Darling (1991; Madhouse) (license rescued from AnimEigo)
 Uzumaki (2000; Omega Micott) (Live action; license rescued from Elite Entertainment)
 Vampire Hunter D: Bloodlust (2001; Madhouse) (license rescued from Urban Vision)
 The Wonderful World of Puss 'n Boots (1969; Toei Animation)
 Wicked City (1987; Madhouse) (license rescued from Urban Vision; digital distribution and HIDIVE streaming via Sentai Filmworks)
 A Wind Named Amnesia (1990; Madhouse) (license rescued from Central Park Media under U.S. Manga Corps)
 You Are Umasou (2010; Ajia-do Animation Works & TMS Entertainment)
 Yowamushi Pedal: The Movie (2015; TMS Entertainment)
 Yowamushi Pedal: Re:RIDE (2014; TMS Entertainment)
 Yowamushi Pedal: Re: ROAD (2015; TMS Entertainment)
 Zatch Bell!: 101st Devil (2004; Toei Animation)
 Zatch Bell!: Attack of Mechavulcan (2005; Toei Animation)
 Zero Woman: Red Handcuffs (1974; Toei Company)

 Original video animations 

 8 Man After (1993; J.C.Staff) (license rescued from Streamline Pictures with itself having distribution by Image Entertainment)
 All Purpose Cultural Cat Girl Nuku Nuku (1992–93; Animate Film) (license rescued from ADV Films)
 All Purpose Cultural Cat-Girl Nuku Nuku DASH! (1998; Ashi Productions) (license rescued from ADV Films)
 Angel Cop (1989–94; DAST) (license rescued from Manga Entertainment)
 Appleseed (1988; Artland with production from Gainax) (license rescued from Manga Entertainment)
 Area 88  (1985–86; Studio Pierrot) (license rescued from Central Park Media under U.S. Manga Corps, and then ADV Films)
 Babel II (1992; J.C.Staff) (license rescued from Streamline Pictures with itself having distribution by Image Entertainment)
 Battle Athletes (1997–98; AIC) (license rescued from Geneon)
 Big Order OVA (2015; Lerche) (distribution for Crunchyroll)
 Blue Seed Beyond (1996–98; Production I.G & Xebec) (license rescued from ADV Films; HIDIVE streaming via Maiden Japan)
 Blue Submarine No. 6 (1998–2000; Gonzo) (license rescued from Bandai Entertainment)
 Casshan: Robot Hunter (1993–94; Artmic with production by Tatsunoko Production & Gainax) (license rescued from Harmony Gold USA and ADV Films)
 Cosmo Warrior Zero (2001; Vega Entertainment) (license rescued from Enoki Films USA and Media Blasters under Anime Works)
 Crusher Joe: The Ice Prison (1989; Studio Nue & Sunrise) (license rescued from AnimEigo)
 Crusher Joe: The Ultimate Weapon: Ash (1989; Studio Nue & Sunrise) (license rescued from AnimEigo)
 Cyber City Oedo 808 (1990–91; Madhouse) (license rescued from Central Park Media under U.S. Manga Corps)
 Dallos (1983–84; Studio Pierrot) (license rescued from Celebrity Home Entertainment)
 Dancouga: Blazing Epilogue (1989–90; Ashi Production)
 Dancouga: Requiem for Victims (1986; Ashi Production)
 Demon City Shinjuku (1988; Madhouse) (license rescued from Central Park Media under U.S. Manga Corps; digital distribution and HIDIVE streaming via Sentai Filmworks)
 Devilman: The Birth (1987; Oh! Production) (license rescued from Manga Entertainment)
 Devilman: Demon Bird Sirène (1990; Oh! Production) (license rescued from Manga Entertainment)
 DNA² (1995; Madhouse & Studio Deen) (license rescued from Central Park Media under U.S. Manga Corps)
 Dragon Half (1993; Production I.G) (license rescued from ADV Films)
 Fist of the North Star: The Legends of the True Savior: Legend of Toki (2008; A.P.P.P. with production by TMS Entertainment)
 Fist of the North Star: The Legends of the True Savior: Legend of Yuria (2007; TMS Entertainment)
 Freedom (2006–08; Sunrise) (license rescued from Bandai Visual USA with later distribution by Bandai Entertainment)
 Fushigi Yûgi OVA (1996–98; Studio Pierrot) (streaming on Crunchyroll only; Media Blasters under Anime Works has current home video rights, which they have license rescued from Geneon)
 Fushigi Yûgi: Eidoken (2001–02; Studio Pierrot) (streaming on Crunchyroll only; Media Blasters under Anime Works has current home video rights, which they have license rescued from Geneon)
 Gakuen Utopia Manabi Straight! OVA (2007; Ufotable)
 The Galaxy Railways: A Letter from the Abandoned Planet (2007; Planet Entertainment)
 Genocyber (1994; Artmic) (license rescued from Central Park Media)
 Getter Robo Armageddon (1998–99; Brain's Base) (license rescued from ADV Films)
 Giant Robo (1992–98; Mu Animation Studio) (license rescued from L.A. Hero, U.S. Renditions folded to Manga Entertainment, and then Media Blasters under Anime Works)
 Gin Rei (1994–95; Mu Animation Studio) (license rescued from Media Blasters under Anime Works)
 Go Nagai World (1991; Triangle Staff & Oh! Production)
 God Mars: The Untold Legend (1988; Tokyo Movie Shinsha)
 Goku Midnight Eye (1989; Madhouse) (license rescued from Urban Vision)
 Golden Boy (1995–96; A.P.P.P.) (license rescued from ADV Films and Media Blasters under Anime Works)
 Gunbuster (1988–89; Gainax) (original dub commissioned by Discotek Media with dub production by Sound Cadance Studios; license rescued from U.S. Renditions which folded to Manga Entertainment, and then Bandai Visual USA)
 Gunbuster 2: Diebuster (2004–06; Gainax) (license rescued from Bandai Visual USA)
 Hajime no Ippo: Mashiba vs. Kimura (2003; Madhouse) (license rescued from Geneon)
 Hurricane Polymar: Holy Blood (1996–97; Tatsunoko Production & J.C.Staff) (license rescued from Urban Vision and Anime Sols)
 Isuca (2015; Arms) (distribution for Crunchyroll)
 Iria: Zeiram the Animation (1994; Ashi Production) (license rescued from Central Park Media with itself having distribution from Image Entertainment, and then Media Blasters under Anime Works)
 Key the Metal Idol (1994–97; Studio Pierrot) (license rescued from Viz Media with volume DVDs having distribution by Geneon, then named Pioneer)
 Kimagure Orange Road OVA (1989–91; Studio Pierrot) (license rescued from AnimEigo)
 The King of Braves GaoGaiGar Final (2000–03; Sunrise)
 Kissxsis (2008–15; Feel)
 KonoSuba: God's Blessings on This Wonderful Choker! (2016; Studio Deen) (distribution for Crunchyroll)
 KonoSuba: God's Blessings on This Wonderful Work of Art! (2017; Studion Deen) (distribution for Crunchyroll)
 Kyo Kara Maoh R (2007–08; Studio Deen)
 Love Hina Again (2002; Xebec) (license rescued from Bandai Entertainment)
 Lupin III: Green vs. Red (2008; TMS Entertainment)
 Lupin III: Is Lupin Still Burning? (2018; Telecom Animation Film) (original dub commissioned by TMS Entertainment)
 Lupin III: The Return of Pycal (2002; TMS Entertainment)
 Machine Robo: Leina Stol in Wolf Sword Legend (1988–89; Ashi Productions) (license rescued from Central Park Media)
 Machine Robo: Lightning Trap - Leina & Laika (1990; Ashi Productions) (license rescued from Central Park Media)
 Mazinkaiser vs. Great General of Darkness (2003; Brain's Base) (original dub commissioned by Discotek Media)
 Mighty Space Miners (1994–95; Triangle Staff) (license rescued from ADV Films)
 New Cutie Honey (1994–95; Toei Animation) (license rescued from ADV Films)
 New Getter Robo (2004; Brain's Base) (license rescued from Geneon)
 NG Knight Ramune & 40 DX (1993; Ashi Productions)
 NG Knight Ramune & 40 EX (1991; Ashi Productions)
 Night Warriors: Darkstalkers' Revenge (1997–98; Madhouse) (license rescued from Viz Media with itself having distribution by Geneon, then called Pioneer, and then Media Blasters via rental kiosks)
 Photon (1997–99; AIC) (license rescued from Central Park Media under U.S. Manga Corps)
 Pilot Candidate: Special Curriculum (2002; Xebec)
 Re: Cutie Honey (2004; Gainax & Toei Animation) (original dub commissioned by Discotek Media)
 Saint Seiya: The Lost Canvas (2009–11; TMS Entertainment) (original dub commissioned exclusively for streaming on Netflix in preparation for the upcoming CGI Netflix Original, known simply as Knights of the Zodiac: Saint Seiya)
 Saiyuki Reload: Burial (2007; Arms)
 School Days: Magical Heart Kokoro-chan (2008; TNK)
 Shin Getter Robo vs Neo Getter Robo (2000–01; Brain's Base)
 Sorcerer Hunters OVAs (1996–97; Xebec) (license rescued from ADV Films)
 Tales of Phantasia: The Animation (2004–06; Actas) (license rescued from Geneon)
 Tales of Symphonia The Animation: Sylvarant Episode (2007; Ufotable)
 Tales of Symphonia The Animation: Tethe'alla Episode (2010–11; Ufotable)
 Tales of Symphonia The Animation: The United World Episode (2011–12; Ufotable)
 Tekkaman Blade II (1994–95; Tatsunoko Production) (license rescued from Urban Vision)
 Violence Jack (1986–90; Ashi Productions (Harem Bomber) & Studio 88 (Evil Town/Hell's Wind)) (license rescued from Manga Entertainment and Central Mass)
 VS Knight Lamune & 40 Fresh (1997; Ashi Productions) (license rescued from Central Park Media; who have released it under Knights of Ramune)

Former titles

Television shows 

 Acrobunch (1982; Kokusai Eiga-sha with production cooperation of Tokyo Movie Shinsha) (former Enoki Films USA license)
 D.N.Angel (2003; Xebec) (was license rescued from ADV Films)
 Earl and Fairy (2008; Artland) (this title is now with Sentai Filmworks)
 Free! (2013; Kyoto Animation) (Season 1 released on Subbed-only DVD as part of partnership with Crunchyroll, with that season being released later on Hybrid Blu-ray + DVD combo pack as part of Crunchyroll's partnership with Funimation)
 Galactic Gale Baxingar (1982–83; Kokusai Eiga-sha) (former Enoki Films USA license)
 Galactic Whirlwind Sasuraiger (1983–84; Kokusai Eiga-sha) (former Enoki Films USA license)
 Galaxy Cyclone Braiger (1981–82; Kokusai Eiga-sha) (former Enoki Films USA license)
 Galilei Donna (2013; A-1 Pictures) (distribution for Crunchyroll)
 Retro Game Master (2003–2011; Fuji TV) (Live action; select episodes only)
 Recently, My Sister Is Unusual (2014; Project No.9) (distribution for Crunchyroll)
 Strike the Blood (2013–14; Silver Link & Connect) (Season 1 only; distribution for Crunchyroll)

Films 

 5 Centimeters per Second (2007; CoMix Wave Films) (distribution for Crunchyroll which was previously done by Bandai Entertainment and was license rescued from ADV Films; this title is now with GKIDS)
 Animal Treasure Island (1971; Toei Animation)
 Blind Woman's Curse (1970; Nikkatsu) (Live action)
 Burst City (1982; Toei Company) (Live action)
 A Chinese Torture Chamber Story (1994; Wong Jing's Workshop Ltd.) (Live action)
 Dead or Alive (1999; Daiei Film & Toei Video) (Live action)
 Ebola Syndrome (1996; Jing's Production Limited) (Live action)
 Electric Dragon 80.000 V (2001; Sunset) (Live action; was license rescued from Unearthed Films)
 The Happiness of the Katakuris (2002; Shochiku) (Live action)
 Locke the Superman (1984; Nippon Animation) (was license rescued from Celebrity Home Entertainment and Central Park Media under U.S. Manga Corps; this title is now with Sentai Filmworks)
 Lupin III: Strange Psychokinetic Strategy (1974; Toho) (Live action)
 Mikadroid: Robokill Beneath Disco Club Layla (1991; Toho) (Live action)
 Oh! My Zombie Mermaid (2004; Soft on Demand) (Live action)
 Panda! Go, Panda! (1972; Tokyo Movie Shinsha) (was license rescued from Geneon; this title is now with GKIDS)
 Panda! Go, Panda!: Rainy Day Circus (1973; Tokyo Movie Shinsha) (was license rescued from Geneon; this title is now with GKIDS)
 The Princess Blade (2001; Gaga) (Live action; was license rescued from ADV Films)
 Sars Wars: Bangkok Zombie Crisis (2004; Chalermthai Studio) (Live action)
 Sayonara Jupiter (1984; Toho) (Live action)
 Sexual Parasite (2004; Total Media Corporation) (Live action)
 Sexy Soccer (2004; City Connection) (Live action)
 Splatter: Naked Blood (1996; Museum K.K.) (Live action)
 Star of David: Hunting for Beautiful Girls (1979; Nikkatsu) (Live action)
 Sukeban Boy (2006; King Records) (Live action)
 Taro the Dragon Boy (1979; Toei Animation)
 Tokyo 10+01 (2002; KSS Films) (Live action)
 Venus Wars (1989; Triangle Staff) (was license rescued from Central Park Media under U.S. Manga Corps; this title is now with Sentai Filmworks)
 The War in Space (1977; Toho) (Live action)

Original video animations 

 Crying Freeman (1988–94; Toei Animation) (was license rescued from ADV Films)
 Lupin III: The Fuma Conspiracy (1987; Tokyo Movie Shinsha) (was license rescued from AnimEigo)
 Mad Bull 34 (1990–92; Magic Bus) (was license rescued from Manga Entertainment)

References

External links 
 
 

 
2005 establishments in Florida
American companies established in 2005
Anime companies
Companies based in Seminole County, Florida
Dubbing (filmmaking)
Entertainment companies established in 2005
Entertainment companies of the United States
Home video companies of the United States
Home video lines
Privately held companies based in Florida